This list includes tournament results for Super Smash Bros. on the Nintendo 64.

Major tournament results

References

Super